Boj is a sugarcane-based, fermented beverage popular in Guatemala.

See also 
Chicha
Guaro

References

Sources 

 Dwight B. Heath, International handbook on alcohol and culture, Greenwood Publishing Group, 1995, p. 99-100

Guatemalan cuisine
Fermented drinks